Ágnes Hranitzky is a Hungarian film editor and director best known for her long-standing collaborations with her spouse Béla Tarr.

Film career
Hranitzky began working in the 1970s as a film editor on Hungarian films. She began collaborating with director Béla Tarr in 1981, editing his film The Outsider. She has edited all of Tarr's films since then.

In 2000, with the film Werckmeister Harmonies Hranitzky began to be credited as a co-director on Tarr's films. The credit developed as Tarr is known for his long takes, the length of which forced Hranitzky to be on set during production in order to assist Tarr with knowing how things would develop in the editing room and which takes would match others.

She co-directed The Man from London in 2007, again with Tarr as lead director. The film premiered In Competition at the 2007 Cannes Film Festival.

In 2011, she again co-directed The Turin Horse, which premiered in 2011, at the 61st Berlin International Film Festival, where it received the Jury Grand Prix.

Personal life
Hranitzky is married to director Béla Tarr and has been with him since they met in 1978.

References

External links
 

Hungarian film directors
Living people
Hungarian film editors
Hungarian women film directors
Women film editors
Year of birth missing (living people)